The bills of the 117th United States Congress list includes proposed federal laws that were introduced in the 117th United States Congress.

The United States Congress is the bicameral legislature of the federal government of the United States consisting of two houses: the lower house known as the House of Representatives and the upper house known as the Senate. The House and Senate are equal partners in the legislative process—legislation cannot be enacted without the consent of both chambers.

Once a bill is approved by one house, it is sent to the other which may pass, reject, or amend it. For the bill to become law, both houses must agree to identical versions of the bill. After passage by both houses, a bill is enrolled and sent to the president for signature or veto.  Bills from the 117th Congress that have successfully completed this process become public laws, listed as Acts of the 117th United States Congress.

Introduced in the House of Representatives

Passed by both houses, no presidential consent needed

Passed by the House, waiting in the Senate

Passed by the House, no Senate consent needed

Incorporated into enacted legislation

Other legislation 

Due to size constraints, this list only includes bills that have been considered by a committee.

Introduced in the Senate

Passed by both houses, no presidential consent needed

Passed by the Senate, waiting in the House

Passed by the Senate, no House consent needed

Incorporated into enacted legislation

Other legislation 

Due to size constraints, this list only includes bills that have been considered by a committee.

See also 
 List of acts of the 117th United States Congress
 Procedures of the U.S. Congress
 List of United States federal legislation
 List of executive actions by Joe Biden
 List of impeachment resolutions introduced against Donald Trump

References

External links 

 Congress's Legislation Website
 Govtrack.us – tracks Congressional activities
 Library of Congress's legislation site 

Lists of United States legislation